Michael D'Andrea Carter (born October 29, 1960) is an American former professional football player and track and field athlete. He played pro football as a nose tackle with the San Francisco 49ers in the National Football League (NFL). Carter was a three-time Pro Bowl and four-time All-Pro selection, including three times on the first-team. He helped the 49ers win three Super Bowls. He was also an Olympic athlete, winning a silver medal in the shot put in the 1984 Summer Olympics.

High school years
Carter set the American national high school record of 81 feet  inches in the 12 pound shot put, adding more than nine feet to the previous record. He set this mark at the 1979 Golden West Invitational track and field meet while competing for Jefferson High School of Dallas, Texas. No high school athlete has come within two feet of this record since. In 2004 this record was selected by USA Track & Field as the 16th greatest moment in American track and field over the previous quarter century, the only high school mark to make the top 25 greatest moments. He was Track and Field News "High School Athlete of the Year" in 1979.

College years
Carter attended Southern Methodist University on a football scholarship. He was a member of both the 1981 (10-1) and 1982 undefeated (11-0-1) team, as the immovable object in the center of the defensive line. In track and field, he won four indoor and three outdoor NCAA shot put championships. He was part of the SMU 1983 NCAA Men's Outdoor Track and Field Championship team. His lifetime best with the 16 pound shot came in his only defeat at an NCAA Championship meet, when in his senior year he launched a throw of 21.76 m (71-4 3/4 feet) to finish 2nd to John Brenner's collegiate record of 21.92m (71–11 feet) at the 1984 NCAA Championships. After graduating, he won the silver medal in the shot put at the 1984 Summer Olympics in Los Angeles.

Professional career
A 6'2", 285-lb. nose tackle, Carter was selected by the San Francisco 49ers in the fifth round of the 1984 NFL Draft. As a professional American football player, he played his entire National Football League career with the 49ers from 1984 to 1992. He was a three-time Pro Bowl selection and a three-time Super Bowl champion. He was the first man to win an Olympic medal and a Super Bowl ring in the same season. Both events were held in California and televised on ABC.

He is a Member of the Texas Track and Field Coaches Association Hall of Fame.

Family and personal life
Carter is married and has three children; D'Andra, Michelle (an Olympic athlete and gold medalist), and Michael Jr. Michelle was the 2005 and 2006 NCAA indoor shot put champion, and won the 2016 gold medal at the Rio Olympics on the last of her six throws, edging two-time defending champion Valerie Adams of New Zealand. Michelle, like her father, also set a national high school record in the shot put.

References

1960 births
Living people
American male shot putters
American football defensive linemen
San Francisco 49ers players
SMU Mustangs football players
National Conference Pro Bowl players
Athletes (track and field) at the 1984 Summer Olympics
Medalists at the 1984 Summer Olympics
Olympic silver medalists for the United States in track and field
Track and field athletes in the National Football League
Universiade gold medalists for the United States
Universiade medalists in athletics (track and field)
Thomas Jefferson High School (Dallas) alumni
Players of American football from Dallas
Track and field athletes from Dallas